MV Sebastiano Veniero, formerly MV Jason,  was a  cargo and passenger motor ship that was built in Monfalcone, Italy in 1940. In 1941 she was damaged by a Royal Navy submarine in the Mediterranean Sea, killing at least 300 UK and Dominion prisoners of war, and possibly many more. She did not sink but was beached on the coast of the Peloponnese, where she was torpedoed again a week later and became a total loss.

Building and seizure
Lloyd Triestino ordered the ship in 1939 from Cantieri Riuniti dell'Adriatico (CRDA) of Fiume.

Lloyd Triestino could not afford to pay for the ship, so CRDA sold her to Nederlandsche Stoomvaart Maatschappij Oceaan (NSMO), the Dutch subsidiary of the UK shipping company Blue Funnel Line. NSMO followed Blue Funnel's policy of naming its ships after figures from Greek antiquity and mythology. Sebastiano Veniero was renamed Jason after the mythological character of the same name.

Jason began her sea trials on 9 May 1940, before Italy entered the Second World War. But the next day Germany invaded the Netherlands, and Italian authorities seized her and assigned her to the Italian shipping company Società Italiana di Armamento (Sidarma). She was renamed Sebastiano Veniero after a 16th-century Venetian admiral and Doge, Sebastiano Venier (1496–1578). Her NSMO crew travelled to Marseille, whence the Blue Funnel ship  repatriated them to the UK.

Loss

Many of the PoWs were in her cargo holds, two of which were quickly flooded by the torpedo explosion. One source gives different figures for the total number of prisoners killed: either 300 or 450–500.

The holds were opened to release trapped PoWs and the damaged ship was beached close to Methoni Castle on Cape Methoni. Many PoWs jumped into the sea and took their chance to swim to the rocky shore. A South African lance corporal, Bernard Friedlander of the 3rd Battalion, Transvaal Scottish Regiment, swam ashore with a rope, which took him 90 minutes. The rope was then used to haul a cable ashore, which was made fast on land. Nearly 1,600 survivors then used the cable to reach safety.

Sebastiano Veniero remained stranded at Methoni, and on 15 December the   hit her with another torpedo.

A German officer saw Friedlander's heroism on 9 December and recommended the lance corporal for a UK bravery award. In July 1945 Friedlander was awarded the George Medal. In 1947 King George VI toured South Africa, and at a ceremony in Johannesburg on 31 March personally decorated Friedlander with the medal.

Records
Accounts of the sinking of the Sebastiano Veniero were recorded by several POWs on board. A book on the topic was published in 1983 entitled No Honour No Glory by Spence Edge and Jim Henderson.

See also

References 

1940 ships
Maritime incidents in December 1941
Ships built by Cantieri Riuniti dell'Adriatico
Ships sunk by British submarines
Shipwrecks of Greece
World War II merchant ships of Germany
World War II merchant ships of Italy
World War II merchant ships of the Netherlands
World War II shipwrecks in the Mediterranean Sea

My Interesting Four years 1940 -1944 L.J. Read, Auckland Museum, NZ Army Museum

No Honour No Glory, The tragic Deaths of 162 Kiwi prisoners of War by Spence Edge & Jim Henderson ISBN 0 00 217208 9 Collins Publication

Fighting with the Enemy New Zealand POWs and the Italian Resistance by Susan Jacobs . ISBN O 14 301862 0 Penguin Publication

Prisoners Of War New Zealand In The Second World War, Official History by W. Wynne Mason Published by R.E. Owen Government Printer